Turabo University at Gurabo is commonly referred as the University of Turabo and known as Universidad del Turabo (UT) or UT-Gurabo in Spanish. It is a private university located in the municipality of Gurabo, Puerto Rico. It was established in 1969 as a secondary campus for the Puerto Rico Junior College.

In 1972 it gained autonomy under the name of Colegio Universitario del Turabo, and in 1982 it received authorization from the Council on Higher Education of Puerto Rico to be renamed as the Universidad del Turabo.

External links
 [Universidad de Turabo http://ut.suagm.edu] - official site.

1969 establishments in Puerto Rico
Gurabo, Puerto Rico
University of Turabo
Universities and colleges in Puerto Rico